Hugaboom Lake is a  lake that is located in northern Delta County, Michigan in the Hiawatha National Forest.  It is just south of the county line with Alger and Schoolcraft countries and about a mile and half east of the intersection of Federal Forest Highway 13 and County Road 440.  Other nearby lakes include Mowe Lake, Corner-Straits Chain of lakes, Ironjaw Lake, and Round Lake.

See also
List of lakes in Michigan

References 

Lakes of Delta County, Michigan
Lakes of Michigan